The following are the Pulitzer Prizes for 1988.

Journalism

Letters and Drama

References

External links
 

Pulitzer Prizes by year
Pulitzer Prize
Pulitzer Prize